Compsidolon is a genus of plant bugs in the family Miridae. There are more than 60 described species in Compsidolon.

Species
These 64 species belong to the genus Compsidolon:

 Compsidolon absinthii (J.Scott, 1870)
 Compsidolon acuticeps (Wagner, 1961)
 Compsidolon ailaoshanensis
 Compsidolon alatavicum (Kerzhner, 1962)
 Compsidolon alcmene Linnavuori, 1971
 Compsidolon alibeganum Linnavuori, 1984
 Compsidolon anagae Gyllensvard, 1968
 Compsidolon balachowskyi (Wagner, 1958)
 Compsidolon beckeri (Reuter, 1904)
 Compsidolon bicolor (Reuter, 1883)
 Compsidolon bipunctatum Wagner, 1975
 Compsidolon collare Wagner, 1976
 Compsidolon crotchi (J.Scott, 1870)
 Compsidolon cyticellum (Lindberg, 1953)
 Compsidolon cytisellum (Lindberg, 1953)
 Compsidolon cytisi (Lindberg, 1953)
 Compsidolon eckerleini Wagner, 1970
 Compsidolon elaegnicola Yasunaga, 1999
 Compsidolon elegantulum Reuter, 1899
 Compsidolon eximium (Reuter, 1879)
 Compsidolon flavidum
 Compsidolon freyi (Wagner, 1954)
 Compsidolon furcillatum Li, Liu, Hu & Zheng, 2007
 Compsidolon galbanus Gyllensvard, 1968
 Compsidolon hiemale Konstantinov, 2006
 Compsidolon hierroense (Wagner, 1954)
 Compsidolon hierroensis (Wagner, 1954)
 Compsidolon hippophaes Muminov, 1979
 Compsidolon hoggaricum Wagner, 1974
 Compsidolon ishmedagan Linnavuori, 1984
 Compsidolon isis Linnavuori, 1993
 Compsidolon kerzhneri Kulik, 1973
 Compsidolon littorale Wagner, 1965
 Compsidolon longiceps (Reuter, 1904)
 Compsidolon maculicorne Linnavuori, 1986
 Compsidolon minutum Wagner, 1970
 Compsidolon nanno Linnavuori, 1971
 Compsidolon narzykulovi Muminov, 1964
 Compsidolon nathaliae (Josifov, 1974)
 Compsidolon nebulosum (Reuter, 1878)
 Compsidolon pallidicorne (Poppius, 1914)
 Compsidolon parietariae V.Putshkov, 1984
 Compsidolon parviceps (Wagner, 1954)
 Compsidolon pilosum
 Compsidolon pseudocrotchi Wagner, 1965
 Compsidolon pterocephali (Lindberg, 1948)
 Compsidolon pumilum (Jakovlev, 1876)
 Compsidolon punctulatum Qi & Nonnaizab, 1995
 Compsidolon qoshanum Linnavuori, 1984
 Compsidolon reraiense (Lindberg, 1940)
 Compsidolon robustum Linnavuori, 1986
 Compsidolon russatum (Odhiambo, 1960)
 Compsidolon sabulicola Linnavuori, 1984
 Compsidolon salicellum (Herrich-schaeffer, 1841)
 Compsidolon salviae (Linnavuori, 1961)
 Compsidolon saundersi (Reuter, 1901)
 Compsidolon saxosum V.Putshkov, 1975
 Compsidolon schrenkianum
 Compsidolon scutellare (Reuter, 1902)
 Compsidolon shrenkianum Konstantinov & Vinokurov, 2011
 Compsidolon surdum Linnavuori, 1975
 Compsidolon torridum Linnavuori, 1975
 Compsidolon uncum Li, Liu, Hu & Zheng, 2007
 Compsidolon verbenae (Wagner, 1954)

References

Further reading

External links

 

Phylini
Articles created by Qbugbot